WHH or Whh may refer to
"Whatever Happened, Happened", an episode of the television series Lost
William Henry Harrison (1773-1841), American general and 9th president of the United States (1841)
Welthungerhilfe, (German for World Hunger Aid) is a German non-governmental aid agency.
Werthamer–Helfand–Hohenberg theory of superconductivity